Raftsundet is a strait in Nordland county, Norway. The strait is crossed by the Raftsund Bridge near the northern mouth of the strait. The Trollfjorden is a small fjord that branches off the strait to the west and it is a well-known tourist attraction. The island of Stormolla lies at the southern mouth where the strait joins the Vestfjorden.

References

Straits of Norway
Landforms of Nordland
Hadsel
Vågan